Addingham is a civil parish in the metropolitan borough of the City of Bradford, West Yorkshire, England.  It contains 120 listed buildings that are recorded in the National Heritage List for England.  Of these, three are listed at Grade I, the highest of the three grades, one is at Grade II*, the middle grade, and the others are at Grade II, the lowest grade.  The parish contains the village of Addingham and the surrounding countryside, including the area of Addingham Moorside to the south.

In the northern part of the parish is the country house of Farfield Hall, which is listed, together with a number of associated structures. Nearby is a Friends' Meeting house, which is also listed together with associated buildings. Most of the listed buildings in the village are houses and cottages, and the other listed buildings include churches and structures in churchyards, public houses, a footbridge and a road bridge, a school converted into a library, former mills, and a boundary stone.  In the surrounding area are listed farmhouses and farm buildings, and both parts contain listed milestones and telephone kiosks.


Key

Buildings

References

Citations

Sources

 

Lists of listed buildings in West Yorkshire